Brutalist architecture is an architectural style that emerged during the 1950s in the United Kingdom, among the reconstruction projects of the post-war era. Brutalist buildings are characterised by minimalist constructions that showcase the bare building materials and structural elements over decorative design. The style commonly makes use of exposed, unpainted concrete or brick, angular geometric shapes and a predominantly monochrome colour palette; other materials, such as steel, timber, and glass, are also featured.

Descending from the modernist movement, brutalism is said to be a reaction against the nostalgia of architecture in the 1940s. Derived from the Swedish phrase nybrutalism, the term "new brutalism" was first used by British architects Alison and Peter Smithson for their pioneering approach to design. The style was further popularised in a 1955 essay by architectural critic Reyner Banham, who also associated the movement with the French phrases béton brut ("raw concrete") and art brut ("raw art"). The style, as developed by architects such as the Smithsons, Hungarian-born Ernő Goldfinger, and the British firm Chamberlin, Powell & Bon, was partly foreshadowed by the modernist work of other architects such as French-Swiss Le Corbusier, Estonian-American Louis Kahn, German-American Mies van der Rohe, and Finnish Alvar Aalto.

In the United Kingdom, brutalism was featured in the design of utilitarian, low-cost social housing influenced by socialist principles and soon spread to other regions around the world. Brutalist designs became most commonly used in the design of institutional buildings, such as universities, libraries, courts, and city halls. The popularity of the movement began to decline in the late 1970s, with some associating the style with urban decay and totalitarianism.

Brutalism has been polarising historically; specific buildings, as well as the movement as a whole, have drawn a range of criticism (often being described as "cold" or "soulless") but have also elicited support from architects and local communities (with many brutalist buildings having become cultural icons, sometimes obtaining listed status). In recent decades, the movement has become a subject of renewed interest. In 2006, several Bostonian architects called for a rebranding of the style to "heroic architecture" to distance it from the negative connotations of the term "brutalism".

History

The term nybrutalism (new brutalism) was coined by the Swedish architect Hans Asplund to describe Villa Göth, a modern brick home in Uppsala, designed in January 1950 by his contemporaries Bengt Edman and Lennart Holm. Showcasing the 'as found' design approach that would later be at the core of brutalism, the house displays visible I-beams over windows, exposed brick inside and out, and poured concrete in several rooms where the tongue-and-groove pattern of the boards used to build the forms can be seen. The term was picked up in the summer of 1950 by a group of visiting English architects, including Michael Ventris, Oliver Cox, and Graeme Shankland, where it apparently "spread like wildfire, and [was] subsequently adopted by a certain faction of young British architects".

The first published usage of the phrase "new brutalism" occurred in 1953, when Alison Smithson used it to describe a plan for their unbuilt Soho house which appeared in the November issue of Architectural Design. She further stated "It is our intention in this building to have the structure exposed entirely, without interior finishes wherever practicable." The Smithsons' Hunstanton School completed in 1954 in Norfolk, and the Sugden House completed in 1955 in Watford, represent the earliest examples of new brutalism in the United Kingdom. Hunstanton school, likely inspired by Mies van der Rohe's 1946 Alumni Memorial Hall at the Illinois Institute of Technology in Chicago, United States, is notable as the first completed building in the world to carry the title of "new brutalist" by its architects. At the time, it was described as "the most truly modern building in England".

The term gained increasingly wider recognition when British architectural historian Reyner Banham used it to identify both an ethic and aesthetic style, in his 1955 essay The New Brutalism. In the essay, Banham described Hunstanton and the Soho house as the "reference by which The New Brutalism in architecture may be defined." Reyner Banham also associated the term new brutalism with art brut and béton brut, meaning raw concrete in French, for the first time. The best-known béton brut architecture is the proto-brutalist work of the Swiss-French architect Le Corbusier, in particular his 1952 Unité d'habitation in Marseille, France; the 1953 Secretariat Building (Palace of Assembly) in Chandigarh, India; and the 1955 church of Notre Dame du Haut in Ronchamp, France.

Banham further expanded his thoughts in the 1966 book, The New Brutalism: Ethic or Aesthetic?, to characterise a somewhat recently established cluster of architectural approaches, particularly in Europe. In the book, Banham says that Le Corbusier's concrete work was a source of inspiration and helped popularise the movement, suggesting "if there is one single verbal formula that has made the concept of Brutalism admissible in most of the world's Western languages, it is that Le Corbusier himself described that concrete work as 'béton-brut'". He further states that "the words 'The New Brutalism' were already circulating, and had acquired some depth of meaning through things said and done, over and above the widely recognised connection with béton brut. The phrase still 'belonged' to the Smithsons, however, and it was their activities above all others that were giving distinctive qualities to the concept of Brutalism."

Characteristics

New brutalism is not only an architectural style; it is also a philosophical approach to architectural design, a striving to create simple, honest, and functional buildings that accommodate their purpose, inhabitants, and location. Stylistically, brutalism is a strict, modernistic design language that has been said to be a reaction to the architecture of the 1940s, much of which was characterised by a retrospective nostalgia.
Peter Smithson believed that the core of brutalism was a reverence for materials, expressed honestly, stating "Brutalism is not concerned with the material as such but rather the quality of material", and "the seeing of materials for what they were: the woodness of the wood; the sandiness of sand." Architect John Voelcker explained that the "new brutalism" in architecture "cannot be understood through stylistic analysis, although some day a comprehensible style might emerge", supporting the Smithsons' description of the movement as "an ethic, not an aesthetic". Reyner Banham felt the phrase "the new brutalism" existed as both an attitude toward design as well as a descriptive label for the architecture itself and that it "eludes precise description, while remaining a living force". He attempted to codify the movement in systematic language, insisting that a brutalist structure must satisfy the following terms, "1, Formal legibility of plan; 2, clear exhibition of structure, and 3, valuation of materials for their inherent qualities 'as found'." Also important was the aesthetic "image", or "coherence of the building as a visual entity".

Brutalist buildings are usually constructed with reoccurring modular elements representing specific functional zones, distinctly articulated and grouped together into a unified whole. There is often an emphasis on graphic expressions in the external elevations and in the whole-site architectural plan in regard to the main functions and people-flows of the buildings. Buildings may use materials such as concrete, brick, glass, steel, timber, rough-hewn stone, and gabions among others. However, due to its low cost, raw concrete is often used and left to reveal the basic nature of its construction with rough surfaces featuring wood 'shuttering' produced when the forms were cast in-situ. Examples are frequently massive in character (even when not large) and challenge traditional notions of what a building should look like with focus given to interior spaces as much as exterior.

A common theme in brutalist designs is the exposure of the building's inner-workings—ranging from their structure and services to their human use—in the exterior of the building. In the Boston City Hall, designed in 1962, the strikingly different and projected portions of the building indicate the special nature of the rooms behind those walls, such as the mayor's office or the city council chambers. From another perspective, the design of the Hunstanton School included placing the facility's water tank, normally a hidden service feature, in a prominent, visible tower. Rather than being hidden in the walls, Hunstanton's water and electric utilities were delivered via readily visible pipes and conduits.

Brutalism as an architectural philosophy was often associated with a socialist utopian ideology, which tended to be supported by its designers, especially by Alison and Peter Smithson, near the height of the style. Indeed, their work sought to emphasize functionality and to connect architecture with what they viewed as the realities of modern life. Among their early contributions were "streets in the sky" in which traffic and pedestrian circulation were rigorously separated, another theme popular in the 1960s. This style had a strong position in the architecture of European communist countries from the mid-1960s to the late 1980s (Bulgaria, Czechoslovakia, East Germany, USSR, Yugoslavia). In Czechoslovakia, Brutalism was presented as an attempt to create a "national" but also "modern socialist" architectural style. Such prefabricated socialist era buildings are called panelaky.

Designers

Architects whose work reflects certain aspects of the brutalist style include Louis Kahn. Architectural historian William Jordy says that although Kahn was "[o]pposed to what he regarded as the muscular posturing of most Brutalism", some of his work "was surely informed by some of the same ideas that came to momentary focus in the brutalist position."

In Australia, examples of the brutalist style are Robin Gibson's Queensland Art Gallery, Ken Woolley's Fisher Library at the University of Sydney (his State Office Block is another), the High Court of Australia by Colin Madigan in Canberra, the MUSE building (also referred to as C7A MUSE) which was the original Library at Macquarie University before the new library replaced it, and WTC Wharf (World Trade Centre in Melbourne). John Andrews's government and institutional structures in Australia also exhibit the style.

Canada possesses numerous examples of brutalist architecture. In the years leading to the 100th anniversary of the Confederation in 1967, the Federal Government financed the construction of many public buildings. Major brutalist examples, not all built as part of the Canadian Centennial, include the Grand Théâtre de Québec, the Édifice Marie-Guyart (formerly Complex-G), Hôtel Le Concorde, and much of the Laval University campus in Quebec City; Habitat 67, Place Bonaventure, the Maison de Radio-Canada, and several metro stations on the Montreal Metro's Green Line; the Confederation Centre of the Arts in Charlottetown; the National Arts Centre in Ottawa; the Hotel Dieu Hospital in Kingston; the Ontario Science Centre, Robarts Library, Rochdale College in Toronto; Royal Manitoba Theatre Centre and Canadian Grain Commission building in Winnipeg; and the church of the Westminster Abbey in British Columbia.

In the United Kingdom, architects associated with the brutalist style include Ernő Goldfinger, wife-and-husband pairing Alison and Peter Smithson, some of the work of Sir Basil Spence, the London County Council/Greater London Council Architects Department, Owen Luder, John Bancroft, and, arguably perhaps, Sir Denys Lasdun, Sir Leslie Martin, Sir James Stirling and James Gowan with their early works. Some well-known examples of brutalist-influenced architecture in the British capital include the Barbican Centre (Chamberlin, Powell and Bon) and the National Theatre (Denys Lasdun).

In the United States, Paul Rudolph and Ralph Rapson were both noted brutalists. Evans Woollen III, a pacesetter among architects in the Midwest, is credited for introducing the Brutalist and Modernist architecture styles to Indianapolis, Indiana. Walter Netsch is known for his brutalist academic buildings. Marcel Breuer was known for his "soft" approach to the style, often using curves rather than corners. In Atlanta, Georgia, the architectural style was introduced to Buckhead's affluent Peachtree Road with the Ted Levy-designed Plaza Towers and Park Place on Peachtree condominiums. Many of the stations of the Washington Metro, particularly older stations, were constructed in the brutalist style.

In Serbia, Božidar Janković was a representative of the so-called "Belgrade School of residence", identifiable by its functionalist relations on the basis of the flat and elaborated in detail the architecture. It is formed by two towers connected with a two-storey bridge and revolving restaurant at the top. The building was designed in the brutalist style with some elements of structuralism and constructivism. It is considered a prime representative of the brutalist architecture in Serbia and one of the best of its style built in the 1960s and the 1970s in the world. The treatment of the form and details is slightly associating the building with postmodernism and is today one of the rare surviving representatives of this style's early period in Serbia. The artistic expression of the gate marked an entire era in Serbian architecture.

On university campuses

An early example of brutalist architecture in British universities was the extension to the department of architecture at the University of Cambridge in 1959 under the influenced of Leslie Martin, the head of the department, and designed by Colin St John Wilson and Alex Hardy, with participation by students at the university. This inspired further brutalist buildings in Cambridge, including the grade II listed University Centre (Howell, Killick, Partridge and Amis Architects; 1963–67) and the grade II listed Churchill College (Sheppard Robson and Partners; 1961–68). Possibly the most important brutalist building at Cambridge is the grade II* listed History Faculty Building (1964–68), the second building in architect James Stirling's Red Trilogy (along with the University of Leicester Engineering Building  and the Florey Building at Queen's College, Oxford, both also grade II*), described in its listing as "a distinctive example of a new approach to education buildings, from a period when the universities were at the forefront of architectural patronage". 

The building of new universities in the UK in the 1960s led to opportunities for brutalist architects. The first to be built was the University of Sussex, designed by Basil Spence, with the grade I listed Falmer House (1960–62) as its centerpiece. The building has been described as a "meeting of Arts and Crafts with modernism", with features such as hand-made bricks that contrast with the pre-fabricated construction of other 1960s campuses, and colonnades of bare, board-marked concrete arches on brick piers inspired by the Colosseum, but is also considered one of the "key Brutalist buildings" by the Royal Institute of British Architects.

One of the finest examples of a 1960s brutalist university campus is Denys Lasdun's work at the University of East Anglia, including six linked halls of residence commonly referred to as 'ziggurats', built over 1964–68 and listed as grade II*. Other notable examples include the grade II listed lecture block at Brunel University, designed by John Heywood of Richard Sheppard, Robson and Partners and built 1965–67, used as a location in Stanley Kubrick's 1971 film A Clockwork Orange, and the central hall of the University of York with its surrounding colleges (all grade II listed), designed by Robert Matthew, Johnson-Marshall & Partners who would go on to build the universities of Bath, Stirling and Ulster.

A notable pairing of brutalist campus buildings is found at Durham University, with Ove Arup's grade I listed Kingsgate Bridge (1963), one of only six post-1961 buildings to have been listed as grade I by 2017, and the grade II listed Dunelm House (Richard Raines of the Architects' Co-Partnership; 1964–66), described in its listing as "the foremost students’ union building of the post-war era in England" but only saved from demolition in 2021 following a five-year campaign by the Twentieth Century Society. Other particularly important (grade II*) brutalist buildings are Denys Lasdun's pair of commissions from the University of London – the School of Oriental and African Studies Philips Building (1973) and the Institute of Education building (1976) – and the Roger Stevens Building at the University of Leeds (Chamberlin, Powell and Bon, 1970), the centrepiece of a group of university buildings in Leeds.

Notable examples in Scotland include the grade A listed Main Library at the University of Edinburgh, designed by J M Marshall and Andrew Merrylees of Spence, Glover and Ferguson (1965–67) and the University of St Andrews's grade A listed Andrew Melville Hall by James Stirling (1963–68).

One of the earliest brutalist buildings in the US was Paul Rudolph's 1963 Art and Architecture Building at Yale University where, as department chair, he was both client and architect, giving him a unique freedom to explore new directions. Rudolph's 1964 design for the University of Massachusetts Dartmouth is a rare example of an entire campus designed in the brutalist style, and was considered by him to be "the most complete realisation of his experiments with urbanism and monumentality". Walter Netsch similarly designed the entire University of Illinois-Chicago Circle Campus (now the East Campus of the University of Illinois at Chicago) under a single, unified brutalist design, built 1963–68. Netsch also designed the brutalist Joseph Regenstein Library for the University of Chicago and the Northwestern University Library. Crafton Hills College in California was designed by desert modern architect E. Stewart Williams in 1965 and built between 1966 and 1976. Williams' brutalist design contrasts with the steep terrain of the area and was chosen in part because it provided a firebreak from the surrounding environment. 

One of the most famous brutalist buildings in America is the Geisel Library at the University of California, San Diego. Designed by William Pereira and built 1969–70, it is said to "occup[y] a fascinating nexus between brutalism and futurism", but was originally intended as a modernist building in steel and glass before cost considerations meant the structural elements were redesigned in concrete and moved to the outside of the building. Evans Woollen III's brutalist Clowes Memorial Hall, a performing arts facility that opened in 1963 on the campus of Butler University in Indianapolis, was praised for its bold and dramatic design. Brigham Young University's brutalist Franklin S. Harris Fine Arts Center, built in 1964 and opened in 1965, is due to be demolished in 2023. The University of Minnesota's West Bank campus features the Rarig Center, a performing arts venue by Ralph Rapson from 1971 that has been called "the best example in the Twin Cities of the style called Brutalism". Additionally, the University's East Bank campus features the Malcolm Moos Health Sciences Tower, the tallest building on the campus. It was designed by The Architects Collaborative, as well as Cerny and Associates, HGA, and Setter Leach and Lindstrom, and was completed in 1974. Litchfield Towers at the University of Pittsburgh was completed in 1963 and is composed of three cylindrical brutalist towers. The university's largest academic building, Wesley W. Posvar Hall, is a brutalist structure completed in 1978. 

The Robarts Library at the University of Toronto was designed by Warner, Burns, Toan & Lunde and built between 1968 and 1973. Although it has been called "a crowning achievement of the brutalist movement", its opening in 1974 came after public sentiment had turned against brutalism, leading to it being condemned as "a blunder on the grandest scale".

Examples of brutalist university campuses can be found in other countries as well. At Rand Afrikaans University in Johannesburg, South Africa (now Kingsway Campus Auckland Park, University of Johannesburg), Willie Meyer and Francois Pienaar designed the university campus, which opened in 1979, as an expression of Afrikaans identity.

Criticism and reception

Brutalism has some severe critics, including Charles III, whose speeches and writings on architecture have criticised brutalism, calling many of the structures "piles of concrete" and likening them to "a monstrous carbuncle". A 2014 article in The Economist noted its unpopularity with the public, observing that a campaign to demolish a building will usually be directed against a Brutalist one. In 2005, the British TV program Demolition ran a public vote to select twelve buildings that ought to be demolished, and eight of those selected were brutalist buildings.

One argument is that this criticism exists in part because concrete façades do not age well in damp, cloudy maritime climates such as those of northwestern Europe and New England. In these climates, the concrete becomes streaked with water stains and sometimes with moss and lichen, and rust stains from the steel reinforcing bars.

Critics of the style find the style unappealing due to its "cold" appearance, projecting an atmosphere of totalitarianism, as well as the association of the buildings with urban decay due to materials weathering poorly in certain climates and the surfaces being prone to vandalism by graffiti. Despite this, the style is appreciated by others, and preservation efforts are taking place in the United Kingdom.

Theodore Dalrymple, a British author, physician, and conservative political commentator, has written for City Journal that brutalist structures represent an artefact of European philosophical totalitarianism, a "spiritual, intellectual, and moral deformity." He called the buildings "cold-hearted", "inhuman", "hideous" and "monstrous". He stated that the reinforced concrete "does not age gracefully but instead crumbles, stains, and decays", which makes alternative building styles superior.

Brutalism now

Although the Brutalist movement was largely over by the late 1970s and early 1980s, having largely given way to Structural Expressionism and Deconstructivism, it has experienced a resurgence of interest since 2015 with the publication of a variety of guides and books, including Brutal London (Zupagrafika, 2015), Brutalist London Map (2015), This Brutal World (2016), SOS Brutalism: A Global Survey (2017) as well as the lavish Atlas of Brutalist Architecture (Phaidon, 2018).

Many of the defining aspects of the style have been softened in newer buildings, with concrete façades often being sandblasted to create a stone-like surface, covered in stucco, or composed of patterned, pre-cast elements. These elements are also found in renovations of older Brutalist buildings, such as the redevelopment of Sheffield's Park Hill.

Villa Göth was listed as historically significant by the Uppsala county administrative board on 3 March 1995. Several Brutalist buildings in the United Kingdom have been granted listed status as historic and others, such as Gillespie, Kidd & Coia's St. Peter's Seminary, named by Prospect magazine's survey of architects as Scotland's greatest post-war building, have been the subject of conservation campaigns. Similar buildings in the United States have been recognized, such as the Pirelli Building in New Haven's Long Wharf. The Twentieth Century Society has unsuccessfully campaigned against the demolition of British buildings such as the Tricorn Centre and Trinity Square multi-storey car park, but successfully in the case of Preston bus station garage, London's Hayward Gallery and others.

Notable buildings that have been demolished include the Smithson's Robin Hood Gardens (2017) in East London, John Madin's Birmingham Central Library (2016), Marcel Breuer's American Press Institute Building in Reston, Virginia, Araldo Cossutta's Third Church of Christ, Scientist in Washington, D.C. (2014), and the Welbeck Street car park in London (2019).

See also
 Utopian architecture
 List of Brutalist structures

References

Further reading

 
 

 
 Monzo, Luigi: Plädoyer für herbe Schönheiten. Gastbeitrag im Rahmen der Austellung "SOS Brutalismus – Rettet die Betonmonster". Pforzheimer Zeitung, 27. February 2018, p. 6. 
 Anna Rita Emili, Pure and simple, the architecture of New Brutalism, Ed.Kappa Rome 2008
 Anna Rita Emili, Architettura estrema, il Neobrutalismo alla prova della contemporaneità, Quodlibet, Macerata 2011
 Anna Rita Emili, Il Brutalismo paulista, L'architettura brasiliana tra teoria e progetto, Manifesto Libri, Roma ISBN 978872859759, pp. 335

External links

"The incredible hulks: Jonathan Meades' A-Z of Brutalism"

 
 
20th-century architectural styles
American architectural styles
British architectural styles
Architecture in England by period or style
1950s architecture
1960s architecture
1970s architecture